The Nathan Dickerson Poole House is a historic home located at Poolesville, Montgomery County, Maryland.  It is a -story, frame dwelling, constructed in 1871 and its design combines elements of the Victorian Gothic and Italianate styles. Also on the property are a frame barn and corn shed of early-20th-century date.

It was listed on the National Register of Historic Places in 1983.

References

External links
, including photo in 1973, at Maryland Historical Trust website

Houses on the National Register of Historic Places in Maryland
Houses completed in 1871
Houses in Montgomery County, Maryland
Italianate architecture in Maryland
Victorian architecture in Maryland
National Register of Historic Places in Montgomery County, Maryland